This is a chronological listing of notable Japanese sexploitation films. The list includes film genres which employ sex and nudity as a main focus, such as pink film, Nikkatsu Roman Porno films, and Toei pinky violence. This list also includes articles on Japanese AVs (adult videos).

1960s

1970s

1980s

1990s

2000s

References
 
 
 
 
 
 

Japanese erotic films
Sexploitation film
Lists of Japanese films
Lists of films by genre